George Harmon Coxe (April 23, 1901 – January 31, 1984) was an American writer of crime fiction. He is perhaps best known for his series featuring crime scene photographer Jack "Flashgun" Casey, which became a popular radio show airing through to the 1940s.

Early years
Coxe grew up in Olean, New York, where he was born, and Elmira, New York. He graduated from Elmira Free Academy, then attended Cornell and Purdue for one year each and then worked for newspapers in New York, Florida, and California. After working for a printer for five years, he became a full-time writer.

Overview
Coxe started writing around 1922, initially working as a newspaperman and penning stories for nickel-and-dime pulp fiction publications. To maximize his earnings, he originally wrote in many genres, including romance and adventure stories. But he was especially fond of crime fiction and soon made it his specialty. He wrote his first book in 1935.

His series characters in the mystery genre are Jack "Flashgun" Casey, Kent Murdock, Leon Morley, Sam Crombie, Max Hale and Jack Fenner. Casey and Murdock are both detectives and photographers. Coxe wrote a total of 63 novels, the last being published in 1975. He was associated with MGM as a writer.

Married to Elizabeth Fowler in 1929, Coxe had two children. 

He was named a Grand Master in 1964 by the Mystery Writers of America. He had been elected the group's national president by acclamation in 1952.

Novels

He wrote a total of 63 novels starting in 1937, the last being published in 1975.

Periodicals
Coxe was a regular in premier pulp magazine Black Mask from 1934-43.

Radio and television
Coxe's stories formed the basis for Dr. Standish, Medical Examiner, which debuted on CBS radio on July 1, 1948. Gary Merrill starred as Standish, who helped police "in cases involving sudden death under mysterious circumstances". The Standish stories were published in national magazines.

His crime photographer character was featured on radio in the series Casey, Crime Photographer and on television in a series with the same title.

Motion pictures
Three films were made from his stories: Women Are Trouble, starring Stuart Erwin, Paul Kelly and Florence Rice, released in 1936; Murder with Pictures, which starred Lew Ayres and Gail Patrick, also released in 1936; and Here's Flash Casey, starring Eric Linden and Boots Mallory, released in 1938.

Awards 

Coxe was the 1964 recipient of the Mystery Writers of America's prestigious Grand Master Award representing the pinnacle of achievement in the mystery field. This award represents significant output of quality in mystery writing

See also

 List of Casey, Crime Photographer stories in Black Mask
 Coxe, "Starting That Mystery Book," The Writer, December 1940.

References

External links

George Harmon Coxe Papers. Yale Collection of American Literature, Beinecke Rare Book and Manuscript Library.

1901 births
1984 deaths
20th-century American novelists
American male novelists
American mystery writers
Edgar Award winners
People from Olean, New York
Writers from New York City
Dime novelists
20th-century American male writers
Novelists from New York (state)